Travell Mazion (July 24, 1995 – July 15, 2020) was an American professional boxer who held the WBC-NABF super welterweight title from January until his death in July 2020.

Professional career
Mazion made his professional debut on April 27, 2013, scoring a first-round technical knockout (TKO) victory over Ricky Young at the Frank Erwin Center in Austin, Texas.

After compiling a record of 16–0 (12 KOs) he challenged for his first professional title, the vacant WBC-NABF super welterweight title against Fernando Castañeda on January 11, 2020 at the Alamodome in San Antonio, Texas. Mazion stopped Castañeda in the first round, scoring a knockout (KO) at 58 seconds into the fight with a left hook to the body.

Professional boxing record

References

External links

1995 births
2020 deaths
American male boxers
Boxers from Texas
Sportspeople from Austin, Texas
Light-middleweight boxers
Road incident deaths in Texas